Neoligia is a genus of moths of the family Noctuidae. Most of the species where previously part of the semicana group of the genus Oligia.

Species
 Neoligia albirena Troubridge & Lafontaine, 2002
 Neoligia atlantica Troubridge & Lafontaine, 2002
 Neoligia canadendsis Troubridge & Lafontaine, 2002
 Neoligia crytora (Franclemont, 1950)
 Neoligia elephas Troubridge & Lafontaine, 2002
 Neoligia exhausta (Smith, 1903)
 Neoligia hardwicki Troubridge & Lafontaine, 2002
 Neoligia inermis Troubridge & Lafontaine, 2002
 Neoligia invenusta Troubridge & Lafontaine, 2002
 Neoligia lancea Troubridge & Lafontaine, 2002
 Neoligia lillooet Troubridge & Lafontaine, 2002
 Neoligia pagosa Troubridge & Lafontaine, 2002
 Neoligia rubirena Troubridge & Lafontaine, 2002
 Neoligia semicana (Walker, 1865)  (syn: Neoligia hausta (Grote, 1882))
 Neoligia subjuncta (Smith, 1898) (syn: Neoligia laevigata (Smith, 1898))
 Neoligia surdirena Troubridge & Lafontaine, 2002
 Neoligia tonsa (Grote, 1880)

References
Natural History Museum Lepidoptera genus database
Neoligia at funet
Neoligia genus info

Noctuidae